The Aeneid (or ) is a Latin epic poem, written by Virgil between 29 and 19 BC, that tells the legendary story of Aeneas, a Trojan who fled the fall of Troy and travelled to Italy, where he became the ancestor of the Romans. It comprises 9,896 lines in dactylic hexameter. The first six of the poem's twelve books tell the story of Aeneas' wanderings from Troy to Italy, and the poem's second half tells of the Trojans' ultimately victorious war upon the Latins, under whose name Aeneas and his Trojan followers are destined to be subsumed.

The hero Aeneas was already known to Greco-Roman legend and myth, having been a character in the Iliad. Virgil took the disconnected tales of Aeneas' wanderings, his vague association with the foundation of Rome and his description as a personage of no fixed characteristics other than a scrupulous pietas, and fashioned the Aeneid into a compelling founding myth or national epic that tied Rome to the legends of Troy, explained the Punic Wars, glorified traditional Roman virtues, and legitimized the Julio-Claudian dynasty as descendants of the founders, heroes, and gods of Rome and Troy.

The Aeneid is widely regarded as Virgil's masterpiece and one of the greatest works of Latin literature.

Story

The Aeneid can be divided into halves based on the disparate subject matter of Books 1–6 (Aeneas' journey to Latium in Italy), commonly associated with Homer's The Odyssey and Books 7–12 (the war in Latium), mirroring The Iliad. These two halves are commonly regarded as reflecting Virgil's ambition to rival Homer by treating both the Odysseys wandering theme and the Iliads warfare themes. This is, however, a rough correspondence, the limitations of which should be borne in mind.

Journey to Italy (books 1–6)

Theme
Virgil begins his poem with a statement of his theme (Arma virumque cano ..., "Of arms and the man I sing ...") and an invocation to the Muse, falling some seven lines after the poem's inception (Musa, mihi causas memora ..., "O Muse, recount to me the causes ..."). He then explains the reason for the principal conflict in the story: the resentment held by the goddess Juno against the Trojan people. This is consistent with her role throughout the Homeric epics.

Book 1: Storm and refuge
Also in the manner of Homer, the story proper begins in medias res (into the middle of things), with the Trojan fleet in the eastern Mediterranean, heading in the direction of Italy. The fleet, led by Aeneas, is on a voyage to find a second home. It has been foretold that in Italy he will give rise to a race both noble and courageous, a race which will become known to all nations. Juno is wrathful, because she had not been chosen in the judgment of Paris, and because her favourite city, Carthage, will be destroyed by Aeneas' descendants. Also, Ganymede, a Trojan prince, was chosen to be the cupbearer to her husband, Jupiter—replacing Juno's daughter, Hebe. Juno proceeds to Aeolus, King of the Winds, and asks that he release the winds to stir up a storm in exchange for a bribe (Deiopea, the loveliest of all her sea nymphs, as a wife). Aeolus agrees to carry out Juno's orders (line 77, "My task is / To fulfill your commands"); the storm then devastates the fleet.

Neptune takes notice: although he himself is no friend of the Trojans, he is infuriated by Juno's intrusion into his domain, and stills the winds and calms the waters, after making sure that the winds would not bother the Trojans again, lest they be punished more harshly than they were this time. The fleet takes shelter on the coast of Africa, where Aeneas rouses the spirits of his men, reassuring them that they have been through worse situations before. There, Aeneas' mother, Venus, in the form of a huntress very similar to the goddess Diana, encourages him and recounts to him the history of Carthage. Eventually, Aeneas ventures into the city, and in the temple of Juno he seeks and gains the favour of Dido, queen of the city. The city has only recently been founded by refugees from Tyre and will later become a great imperial rival and enemy to Rome.

Meanwhile, Venus has her own plans. She goes to her son, Aeneas' half-brother Cupid, and tells him to imitate Ascanius (the son of Aeneas and his first wife Creusa). Thus disguised, Cupid goes to Dido and offers the gifts expected from a guest. As Dido cradles the boy during a banquet given in honour of the Trojans, Cupid secretly weakens her sworn fidelity to the soul of her late husband Sychaeus, who was murdered by her brother Pygmalion back in Tyre, by inciting fresh love for Aeneas.

Book 2: Trojan Horse and sack of Troy

In books 2 and 3, Aeneas recounts to Dido the events that occasioned the Trojans' arrival. He begins the tale shortly after the war described in the Iliad. Cunning Ulysses devised a way for Greek warriors to gain entry into the walled city of Troy by hiding in a large wooden horse. The Greeks pretended to sail away, leaving a warrior, Sinon, to mislead the Trojans into believing that the horse was an offering and that if it were taken into the city, the Trojans would be able to conquer Greece. The Trojan priest Laocoön saw through the Greek plot and urged the horse's destruction, but his protests fell on deaf ears, so he hurled his spear at the horse. Then, in what would be seen by the Trojans as punishment from the gods, two serpents emerged from the sea and devoured Laocoön, along with his two sons. The Trojans then took the horse inside the fortified walls, and after nightfall the armed Greeks emerged from it, opening the city's gates to allow the returned Greek army to slaughter the Trojans.

In a dream, Hector, the fallen Trojan prince, advised Aeneas to flee with his family. Aeneas awoke and saw with horror what was happening to his beloved city. At first he tried to fight the enemy, but soon he lost his comrades and was left alone to fend off the Greeks. He witnessed the murder of Priam by Achilles' son Pyrrhus. His mother, Venus, appeared to him and led him back to his house. Aeneas tells of his escape with his son, Ascanius, his wife Creusa, and his father, Anchises, after the occurrence of various omens (Ascanius' head catching fire without his being harmed, a clap of thunder and a shooting star). At the city gates, they notice they lost Creusa, and Aeneas goes back into the city to look for her. He only encounters her ghost, who tells him that his destiny is to reach Hesperia, where kingship and a royal spouse await him.

Book 3: Wanderings
Aeneas continues his account to Dido by telling how, rallying the other survivors, he built a fleet of ships and made landfall at various locations in the Mediterranean: Thrace, where they find the last remains of a fellow Trojan, Polydorus; Delos, where Apollo tells them to leave and to find the land of their forefathers; Crete, which they believe to be that land, and where they build their city (Pergamea) and promptly desert it after a plague proves this is not the place for them; the Strophades, where they encounter the Harpy Celaeno, who tells them to leave her island and to look for Italy, though, she prophesies, they won't find it until hunger forces them to eat their tables; and Buthrotum. This last city had been built in an attempt to replicate Troy. In Buthrotum, Aeneas meets Andromache, the widow of Hector. She is still lamenting the loss of her valiant husband and beloved child. There, too, Aeneas sees and meets Helenus, one of Priam's sons, who has the gift of prophecy. Through him, Aeneas learns the destiny laid out for him: he is divinely advised to seek out the land of Italy (also known as Ausonia or Hesperia), where his descendants will not only prosper, but in time rule the entire known world. In addition, Helenus also bids him go to the Sibyl in Cumae.

Heading into the open sea, Aeneas leaves Buthrotum, rounds the south eastern tip of Italy and makes his way towards Sicily (Trinacria). There, they are caught in the whirlpool of Charybdis and driven out to sea. Soon they come ashore at the land of the Cyclopes. There they meet a Greek, Achaemenides, one of Ulysses' men, who has been left behind when his comrades escaped the cave of Polyphemus. They take Achaemenides on board and narrowly escape Polyphemus. Shortly after, at Drepanum, Aeneas' father Anchises dies of old age. Aeneas heads on (towards Italy) and gets deflected to Carthage (by the storm described in book 1). Here, Aeneas ends his account of his wanderings to Dido.

Book 4: Fate of Queen Dido
Dido realises that she has fallen in love with Aeneas. Juno seizes upon this opportunity to make a deal with Venus, Aeneas' mother, with the intention of distracting Aeneas from his destiny of founding a city in Italy. Aeneas is inclined to return Dido's love, and during a hunting expedition, a storm drives them into a small covered grove in which Aeneas and Dido presumably made love, after which Juno presides over what Dido considers a marriage ceremony. But when Jupiter sends Mercury to remind Aeneas of his duty, he has no choice but to part. At the behest of Mercury's apparition, he leaves clandestinely at night. Her heart broken, Dido commits suicide by stabbing herself upon a pyre with Aeneas' sword. Before dying, she predicts eternal strife between Aeneas' people and hers; "rise up from my bones, avenging spirit" (4.625, trans. Fitzgerald) is a possible invocation to Hannibal.

Book 5: Sicily
Looking back from the deck of his ship, Aeneas sees the smoke of Dido's funeral pyre, and although he does not understand the exact reason behind it, he understands it as a bad omen, considering the angry madness of her love.

Hindered by bad weather from reaching Italy, the Trojans return to where they started at the beginning of book 1. Book 5 then takes place on Sicily and centers on the funeral games that Aeneas organises for the anniversary of his father's death. Aeneas organises celebratory games for the men—a boat race, a foot race, a boxing match, and an archery contest. In all those contests, Aeneas is careful to reward winners and losers, showing his leadership qualities by not allowing antagonism even after foul play. Each of these contests comments on past events or prefigures future events: the boxing match, for instance, is "a preview of the final encounter of Aeneas and Turnus", and the dove, the target during the archery contest, is connected to the deaths of Polites and King Priam in Book 2 and that of Camilla in Book 11. Afterwards, Ascanius leads the boys in a military parade and mock battle, the Lusus Troiae—a tradition he will teach the Latins while building the walls of Alba Longa.

During these events, Juno, via her messenger Iris, who disguises herself as an old woman, incites the Trojan women to burn the fleet and prevent the Trojans from ever reaching Italy, but her plan is thwarted when Ascanius and Aeneas intervene. Aeneas prays to Jupiter to quench the fires, which the god does with a torrential rainstorm. An anxious Aeneas is comforted by a vision of his father, who tells him to go to the underworld to receive a vision of his and Rome's future. In return for safe passage to Italy, the gods, by order of Jupiter, will receive one of Aeneas' men as a sacrifice: Palinurus, who steers Aeneas' ship by night, is put to sleep by Somnus and falls overboard.

Book 6: Underworld

Aeneas, with the guidance of the Cumaean Sibyl, descends into the underworld. They pass by crowds of the dead by the banks of the river Acheron and are ferried across by Charon before passing by Cerberus, the three-headed guardian of the underworld. Then Aeneas is shown the fates of the wicked in Tartarus and is warned by the Sibyl to bow to the justice of the gods. He also meets the shade of Dido, who remains unreconcilable. He is then brought to green fields of Elysium. There he speaks with the spirit of his father and is offered a prophetic vision of the destiny of Rome.

War in Italy (books 7–12)

Book 7: Arrival in Latium and outbreak of war 
Upon returning to the land of the living, Aeneas leads the Trojans to settle in Latium, where King Latinus received oracles pointing towards the arrival of strangers and bidding him to marry his daughter Lavinia to the foreigners, and not to Turnus, the ruler of another native people, the Rutuli. Juno, unhappy with the Trojans' favourable situation, summons the fury Alecto from the underworld to stir up a war between the Trojans and the locals. Alecto incites Amata, the Queen of Latium and the wife of Latinus, to demand that Lavinia be married to noble Turnus, and she causes Ascanius to wound a revered deer during a hunt. Hence, although Aeneas wishes to avoid a war, hostilities break out. The book closes with a catalogue of Italic warriors.

Book 8: Visit to Pallanteum, site of future Rome 

Given the impending war, Aeneas seeks help from the Tuscans, enemies of the Rutuli, after having been encouraged to do so in a dream by Tiberinus. At the place where Rome will be, he meets a friendly Greek, King Evander of Arcadia. His son Pallas agrees to join Aeneas and lead troops against the Rutuli. Venus urges her spouse Vulcan to create weapons for Aeneas, which she then presents to Aeneas as a gift. On the shield, the future history of Rome is depicted.

Book 9: Turnus' siege of Trojan camp 
Meanwhile, the Trojan camp is attacked by Turnus—spurred on by Juno, who informs him that Aeneas is away from his camp—and a midnight raid by the Trojans Nisus and Euryalus on Turnus' camp leads to their death. The next day, Turnus manages to breach the gates but is forced to retreat by jumping into the Tiber.

Book 10: First battle 
A council of the gods is held, in which Venus and Juno speak before Jupiter, and Aeneas returns to the besieged Trojan camp accompanied by his new Arcadian and Tuscan allies. In the ensuing battle many are slain—notably Pallas, whom Evander has entrusted to Aeneas but who is killed by Turnus. Mezentius, Turnus' close associate, allows his son Lausus to be killed by Aeneas while he himself flees. He reproaches himself and faces Aeneas in single combat—an honourable but essentially futile endeavour leading to his death.

Book 11: Armistice and battle with Camilla 
After a short break in which the funeral ceremony for Pallas takes place, the war continues. Another notable native, Camilla, an Amazon character and virgin devoted to Diana, fights bravely but is killed, poisoned by the coward Arruns, who in turn is struck dead by Diana's sentinel Opis.

Book 12: Final battle and duel of Aeneas and Turnus 
Single combat is proposed between Aeneas and Turnus, but Aeneas is so obviously superior to Turnus that the Rutuli, urged on by Turnus' divine sister, Juturna—who in turn is instigated by Juno—break the truce. Aeneas is injured by an arrow but is soon healed with the help of his mother Venus and returns to the battle. Turnus and Aeneas dominate the battle on opposite wings, but when Aeneas makes a daring attack at the city of Latium (causing the queen of Latium to hang herself in despair), he forces Turnus into single combat once more. In the duel, Turnus' strength deserts him as he tries to hurl a rock, and Aeneas' spear goes through his thigh. As Turnus is on his knees, begging for his life, the epic ends with Aeneas initially tempted to obey Turnus' pleas to spare his life, but then killing him in rage when he sees that Turnus is wearing Aeneas' friend Pallas' belt over his shoulder as a trophy.

Reception

Critics of the Aeneid focus on a variety of issues. The tone of the poem as a whole is a particular matter of debate; some see the poem as ultimately pessimistic and politically subversive to the Augustan regime, while others view it as a celebration of the new imperial dynasty. Virgil makes use of the symbolism of the Augustan regime, and some scholars see strong associations between Augustus and Aeneas, the one as founder and the other as re-founder of Rome. A strong teleology, or drive towards a climax, has been detected in the poem. The Aeneid is full of prophecies about the future of Rome, the deeds of Augustus, his ancestors, and famous Romans, and the Carthaginian Wars; the shield of Aeneas even depicts Augustus' victory at Actium in 31 BC. A further focus of study is the character of Aeneas. As the protagonist of the poem, Aeneas seems to constantly waver between his emotions and commitment to his prophetic duty to found Rome; critics note the breakdown of Aeneas' emotional control in the last sections of the poem where the "pious" and "righteous" Aeneas mercilessly slaughters the Latin warrior Turnus.

The Aeneid appears to have been a great success. Virgil is said to have recited Books 2, 4 and 6 to Augustus; the mention of her son, Marcellus, in book 6 apparently caused Augustus' sister Octavia to faint. The poem was unfinished when Virgil died in 19 BC.

Virgil's death, and editing

According to tradition, Virgil traveled to Greece around 19 BC to revise the Aeneid. After meeting Augustus in Athens and deciding to return home, Virgil caught a fever while visiting a town near Megara. Virgil crossed to Italy by ship, weakened with disease, and died in Brundisium harbour on 21 September 19 BC, leaving a wish that the manuscript of the Aeneid was to be burned. Augustus ordered Virgil's literary executors, Lucius Varius Rufus and Plotius Tucca, to disregard that wish, instead ordering the Aeneid to be published with as few editorial changes as possible. As a result, the existing text of the Aeneid may contain faults which Virgil was planning to correct before publication. However, the only obvious imperfections are a few lines of verse that are metrically unfinished (i.e., not a complete line of dactylic hexameter). Other alleged "imperfections" are subject to scholarly debate.

History

The Aeneid was written in a time of major political and social change in Rome, with the fall of the Republic and the Final War of the Roman Republic having torn through society and many Romans' faith in the "Greatness of Rome" severely faltering. However, the new emperor, Augustus Caesar, began to institute a new era of prosperity and peace, specifically through the re-introduction of traditional Roman moral values. The Aeneid was seen as reflecting this aim, by depicting the heroic Aeneas as a man devoted and loyal to his country and its prominence, rather than his own personal gains. In addition, the Aeneid gives mythic legitimization to the rule of Julius Caesar and, by extension, to his adopted son Augustus, by immortalizing the tradition that renamed Aeneas' son, Ascanius (called Ilus from Ilium, meaning Troy), Iulus, thus making him an ancestor of the gens Julia, the family of Julius Caesar, and many other great imperial descendants as part of the prophecy given to him in the Underworld. (The meter shows that the name "Iulus" is pronounced as three syllables, not as "Julus".)

The perceived deficiency of any account of Aeneas' marriage to Lavinia or his founding of the Roman race led some writers, such as the 15th-century Italian poet Maffeo Vegio (through his Thirteenth Book of the Aeneid widely printed in the Renaissance), Pier Candido Decembrio (whose attempt was never completed), Claudio Salvucci (in his 1994 epic poem The Laviniad), and Ursula K. Le Guin (in her 2008 novel Lavinia) to compose their own supplements.

Despite the polished and complex nature of the Aeneid (legend stating that Virgil wrote only three lines of the poem each day), the number of half-complete lines and the abrupt ending are generally seen as evidence that Virgil died before he could finish the work. Some legends state that Virgil, fearing that he would die before he had properly revised the poem, gave instructions to friends (including the current emperor, Augustus) that the Aeneid should be burned upon his death, owing to its unfinished state and because he had come to dislike one of the sequences in Book VIII, in which Venus and Vulcan made love, for its nonconformity to Roman moral virtues. The friends did not comply with Virgil's wishes and Augustus himself ordered that they be disregarded. After minor modifications, the Aeneid was published. Because it was composed and preserved in writing rather than orally, the text exhibits less variation than other classical epics.

Style
As with other classical Latin poetry, the meter is based on the length of syllables rather than the stress, though the interplay of meter and stress is also important. Virgil also incorporated such poetic devices as alliteration, onomatopoeia, synecdoche, and assonance. Furthermore, he uses personification, metaphor, and simile in his work, usually to add drama and tension to the scene. An example of a simile can be found in book II when Aeneas is compared to a shepherd who stood on the high top of a rock unaware of what is going on around him. It can be seen that just as the shepherd is a protector of his sheep, so too is Aeneas to his people.

As was the rule in classical antiquity, an author's style was seen as an expression of his personality and character. Virgil's Latin has been praised for its evenness, subtlety and dignity.

Structure
The Aeneid, like other classical epics, is written in dactylic hexameters: each line consists of six metrical feet made up of dactyls (one long syllable followed by two short syllables) and spondees (two long syllables). This epic consists of twelve books, and the narrative is broken up into three sections of four books each, respectively addressing Dido; the Trojans' arrival in Italy; and the war with the Latins. Each book has roughly 700–900 lines. The Aeneid comes to an abrupt ending, and scholars have speculated that Virgil died before he could finish the poem.

Themes

Pietas
The Roman ideal of pietas ("piety, dutiful respect"), which can be loosely translated from the Latin as a selfless sense of duty toward one's
filial, religious, and societal obligations, was a crux of ancient Roman morality. Throughout the Aeneid, Aeneas serves as the embodiment of
pietas, with the phrase "pious Aeneas" occurring 20 times throughout the poem, thereby fulfilling his capacity as the father of the Roman people.
For instance, in Book 2 Aeneas describes how he carried his father Anchises from the burning city of Troy: "No help/ Or hope of help existed./
So I resigned myself, picked up my father,/ And turned my face toward the mountain range." Furthermore, Aeneas ventures into the underworld, thereby fulfilling Anchises'
wishes. His father's gratitude is presented in the text by the following lines: "Have you at last come, has that loyalty/ Your father counted on conquered the journey?

However, Aeneas' pietas extends beyond his devotion to his father: we also see several examples of his religious fervour. Aeneas is consistently subservient to the gods, even in actions opposed to his own desires, as he responds to one such divine command, "I sail to Italy not of my own free will."

In addition to his religious and familial pietas, Aeneas also displays fervent patriotism and devotion to his people, particularly in a military capacity. For instance, as he and his followers leave Troy, Aeneas swears that he will "take up/ The combat once again. We shall not all/ Die this day unavenged."

Aeneas is a symbol of pietas in all of its forms, serving as a moral paragon to whom a Roman should aspire.

Divine intervention
One of the most recurring themes in the Aeneid is that of divine intervention. Throughout the poem, the gods are constantly influencing the main characters and trying to change and impact the outcome, regardless of the fate that they all know will occur. For example, Juno comes down and acts as a phantom Aeneas to drive Turnus away from the real Aeneas and all of his rage from the death of Pallas. Even though Juno knows in the end that Aeneas will triumph over Turnus, she does all she can to delay and avoid this outcome.

Divine intervention occurs multiple times, in Book 4 especially. Aeneas falls in love with Dido, delaying his ultimate fate of traveling to Italy. However, it is actually the gods who inspired the love, as Juno plots:

Dido and the Trojan captain [will come]
To one same cavern. I shall be on hand,
And if I can be certain you are willing,
There I shall marry them and call her his.
A wedding, this will be.

Juno is speaking to Venus, making an agreement and influencing the lives and emotions of both Dido and Aeneas. Later in the same book, Jupiter steps in and restores what is the true fate and path for Aeneas, sending Mercury down to Aeneas' dreams, telling him that he must travel to Italy and leave his new-found lover. As Aeneas later pleads with Dido:

The gods' interpreter, sent by Jove himself –
I swear it by your head and mine – has brought
Commands down through the racing winds!...
I sail for Italy not of my own free will.

Several of the gods try to intervene against the powers of fate, even though they know what the eventual outcome will be. The interventions are really just distractions to continue the conflict and postpone the inevitable. If the gods represent humans, just as the human characters engage in conflicts and power struggles, so too do the gods.

Fate
Fate, described as a preordained destiny that men and gods have to follow, is a major theme in the Aeneid. One example is when Aeneas is reminded of his fate through Jupiter and Mercury while he is falling in love with Dido. Mercury urges, "Think of your expectations of your heir,/ Iulus, to whom the whole Italian realm, the land/ Of Rome, are due." Mercury is referring to Aeneas' preordained fate to found Rome, as well as Rome's preordained fate to rule the world:

He was to be ruler of Italy,
Potential empire, armorer of war;
To father men from Teucer's noble blood
And bring the whole world under law's dominion.

It is important to recognize that there is a marked difference between fate and divine intervention, as even though the gods might remind mortals of their eventual fate, the gods themselves are not in control of it. For example, the opening lines of the poem specify that Aeneas "came to Italy by destiny", but is also harassed by the separate force of "baleful Juno in her sleepless rage". Even though Juno might intervene, Aeneas' fate is set in stone and cannot be changed.

Later in Book 6, when Aeneas visits the underworld, his father Anchises introduces him to the larger fate of the Roman people, as contrasted against his own personal fate to found Rome:

So raptly, everywhere, father and son
Wandered the airy plain and viewed it all.
After Anchises had conducted him
To every region and had fired his love
Of glory in the years to come, he spoke
Of wars that he might fight, of Laurentines,
And of Latinus' city, then of how
He might avoid or bear each toil to come.

Violence and conflict
From the very beginning of the Aeneid, violence and conflict are used as a means of survival and conquest. Aeneas' voyage is caused by the Trojan War and the destruction of
Troy. Aeneas describes to Dido in Book 2 the massive amount of destruction that occurs after the Greeks sneak into Troy. He recalls that he asks his men to "defend/ A city
lost in flames. Come, let us die,/ We'll make a rush into the thick of it."
This is one of the first examples of how violence begets violence: even though the Trojans know they have lost the battle, they continue to fight for their country.

This violence continues as Aeneas makes his journey. Dido kills herself in an excessively violent way over a pyre in order to end and escape her worldly problem: being heartbroken
over the departure of her "husband" Aeneas. Queen Dido's suicide is a double edged sword. While releasing herself from the burden of her pain through violence, her last words
implore her people to view Aeneas' people with hate for all eternity:

This is my last cry, as my last blood flows.
Then, O my Tyrians, besiege with hate
His progeny and all his race to come:
Make this your offering to my dust. No love,
No pact must be between our peoples.

Furthermore, her people, hearing of their queen's death, have only one avenue on which to direct the blame: the already-departed Trojans. Thus, Dido's request of her people
and her people's only recourse for closure align in their mutual hate for Aeneas and his Trojans. In effect, Dido's violent suicide leads to the violent nature of the
later relationship between Carthage and Rome.

Finally, when Aeneas arrives in Latium, conflict inevitably arises. Juno sends Alecto, one of the Furies, to cause Turnus to go against Aeneas. In the ensuing battles, Turnus
kills Pallas, who is supposed to be under Aeneas' protection. This act of violence causes Aeneas to be consumed with fury. Although Turnus asks for mercy in their final encounter,
when Aeneas sees that Turnus has taken Pallas' sword belt, Aeneas proclaims:

You in your plunder, torn from one of mine,
Shall I be robbed of you? This wound will come
From Pallas: Pallas makes this offering
And from your criminal blood exacts his due.

This final act of violence shows how Turnus' violence—the act of killing Pallas—inevitably leads to more violence and his own death.

It is possible that the recurring theme of violence in the Aeneid is a subtle commentary on the bloody violence contemporary readers would have just experienced during the Late Republican
civil wars. The Aeneid potentially explores whether the violence of the civil wars was necessary to establish a lasting peace under Augustus, or whether it would just lead to more violence in the future.

Propaganda

Written during the reign of Augustus, the Aeneid presents the hero Aeneas as a strong and powerful leader. The favourable representation of Aeneas parallels
Augustus in that it portrays his reign in a progressive and admirable light, and allows Augustus to be positively associated with the portrayal of Aeneas.
Although Virgil's patron Maecenas was obviously not Augustus himself, he was still a high figure within Augustus' administration and could have personally
benefitted from representing Aeneas in a positive light.

In the Aeneid, Aeneas is portrayed as the singular hope for the rebirth of the Trojan people. Charged with the preservation of his people by divine authority, Aeneas is symbolic of Augustus' own accomplishments in establishing order after the long period of chaos of the Roman civil wars. Augustus as the light of savior and the last
hope of the Roman people is a parallel to Aeneas as the savior of the Trojans. This parallel functions as propaganda in support of Augustus, as it depicts the Trojan people,
future Romans themselves, as uniting behind a single leader who will lead them out of ruin:

New refugees in a great crowd: men and women
Gathered for exile, young-pitiful people
Coming from every quarter, minds made up,
With their belongings, for whatever lands
I'd lead them to by sea.

Later in Book 6, Aeneas travels to the underworld where he sees his father Anchises, who tells him of his own destiny as well as that of
the Roman people. Anchises describes how Aeneas' descendant Romulus will found the great city of Rome,
which will eventually be ruled by Caesar Augustus:

Turn your two eyes
This way and see this people, your own Romans.
Here is Caesar, and all the line of Iulus,
All who shall one day pass under the dome
Of the great sky: this is the man, this one,
Of whom so often you have heard the promise,
Caesar Augustus, son of the deified,
Who shall bring once again an Age of Gold
To Latium, to the land where Saturn reigned
In early times.

Virgil writes about the fated future of Lavinium, the city that Aeneas will found, which will in turn lead directly to the
golden reign of Augustus. Virgil is using a form of literary propaganda to demonstrate the Augustan
regime's destiny to bring glory and peace to Rome. Rather than use Aeneas indirectly as a positive parallel
to Augustus as in other parts of the poem, Virgil outright praises the emperor in Book 6, referring to Augustus as a harbinger for the glory
of Rome and new levels of prosperity.

Allegory
The poem abounds with smaller and greater allegories. Two of the debated allegorical sections pertain to the exit from the underworld and to Pallas' belt.

Aeneas' leaving the underworld through the gate of false dreams has been variously interpreted: one suggestion is that the passage simply refers to the time of day at which Aeneas returned to the world of the living; another is that it implies that all of Aeneas' actions in the remainder of the poem are somehow "false". In an extension of the latter interpretation, it has been suggested that Virgil is conveying that the history of the world since the foundation of Rome is but a lie. Other scholars claim that Virgil is establishing that the theological implications of the preceding scene (an apparent system of reincarnation) are not to be taken as literal.

The second section in question is

This section has been interpreted to mean that for the entire passage of the poem, Aeneas, who symbolizes pietas (piety or morality), in a moment becomes furor (fury), thus destroying what is essentially the primary theme of the poem itself. Many have argued over these two sections. Some claim that Virgil meant to change them before he died, while others find that the location of the two passages, at the very end of the so-called Volume I (Books 1–6, the Odyssey), and Volume II (Books 7–12, the Iliad), and their short length, which contrasts with the lengthy nature of the poem, are evidence that Virgil placed them purposefully there.

Influence

The Aeneid is a cornerstone of the Western canon, and early (at least by the 2nd century AD) became one of the essential elements of a Latin education, usually required to be memorized. Even after the decline of the Roman Empire, it "remained central to a Latin education". In Latin-Christian culture, the Aeneid was one of the canonical texts, subjected to commentary as a philological and educational study, with the most complete commentary having been written by the 4th-century grammarian Maurus Servius Honoratus. It was widely held to be the pinnacle of Latin literature, much in the same way that the Iliad was seen to be supreme in Greek literature.

The strong influence of the Aeneid has been identified in the development of European vernacular literatures—some English works that show its influence being Beowulf, Layamon's Brut (through the source text Historia Regum Britanniae), The Faerie Queene, and Milton's Paradise Lost. The Italian poet Dante Alighieri was himself profoundly influenced by the Aeneid, so much so that his magnum opus The Divine Comedy, itself widely considered central to the western canon, includes a number of quotations from and allusions to the Aeneid and features the author Virgil as a major character – the guide of Dante through the realms of the Inferno and Purgatorio. Another continental work displaying the influence of the Aeneid is the 16th-century Portuguese epic Os Lusíadas, written by Luís de Camões and dealing with Vasco da Gama's voyage to India.

The importance of Latin education itself was paramount in Western culture: "from 1600 to 1900, the Latin school was at the center of European education, wherever it was found"; within that Latin school, Virgil was taught at the advanced level and, in 19th-century England, special editions of Virgil were awarded to students who distinguished themselves. In the United States, Virgil and specifically the Aeneid were taught in the fourth year of a Latin sequence, at least until the 1960s; the current (2011) Advanced Placement curriculum in Latin continues to assign a central position to the poem: "The AP Latin: Virgil Exam is designed to test the student's ability to read, translate, understand, analyze, and interpret the lines of the Aeneid that appear on the course syllabus in Latin."

Many phrases from this poem entered the Latin language, much as passages from Shakespeare and Alexander Pope have entered the English language. One example is from Aeneas' reaction to a painting of the sack of Troy: Sunt lacrimae rerum et mentem mortalia tangunt—"These are the tears of things, and our mortality cuts to the heart" (Aeneid I, 462). The influence is also visible in very modern work: Brian Friel's Translations (a play written in the 1980s, set in 19th-century Ireland), makes references to the classics throughout and ends with a passage from the Aeneid:
Urbs antiqua fuit—there was an ancient city which, 'tis said, Juno loved above all the lands. And it was the goddess' aim and cherished hope that here should be the capital of all nations—should the fates perchance allow that. Yet in truth she discovered that a race was springing from Trojan blood to overthrow some day these Tyrian towers—a people late regem belloque superbum—kings of broad realms and proud in war who would come forth for Libya's downfall.

English translations 
The first full and faithful rendering of the poem in an Anglic language is the Scots translation by Gavin Douglas—his Eneados, completed in 1513, which also included Maffeo Vegio's supplement. Even in the 20th century, Ezra Pound considered this still to be the best Aeneid translation, praising the "richness and fervour" of its language and its hallmark fidelity to the original. The English translation by the 17th-century poet John Dryden is another important version. Most classic translations, including both Douglas and Dryden, employ a rhyme scheme; most more modern attempts do not.

Recent English verse translations include those by British Poet Laureate Cecil Day-Lewis (1963), who strove to render Virgil's original hexameter line; Allen Mandelbaum (honoured by a 1973 National Book Award); Library of Congress Poet Laureate Robert Fitzgerald (1981); Stanley Lombardo (2005); Robert Fagles (2006); Sarah Ruden (2008); Barry B. Powell (2015); David Ferry (2017); Len Krisak (2020); and Shadi Bartsch (2021).

There have also been partial translations, such as those by Henry Howard, Earl of Surrey (Book 2 and Book 4), and Seamus Heaney (Book 6).

Adaptations 

One of the first operas based on the story of the Aeneid was the English composer Henry Purcell's Dido and Aeneas (1688). The opera is famous for its aria "Dido's Lament" ('When I am laid in earth'), of which the first line of the melody is inscribed on the wall by the door of the Purcell Room, a concert hall in London.

The story of the Aeneid was made into the grand opera Les Troyens (1856–1858) by the French composer Hector Berlioz.

The Aeneid was the basis for the 1962 Italian film The Avenger and the 1971–1972 television serial Eneide.

In the musical Spring Awakening, based on the play of the same title by Frank Wedekind, schoolboys study the Latin text, and the first verse of Book 1 is incorporated into the number "All That's Known".

Ursula Le Guin's 2008 novel Lavinia is a free prose retelling of the last six books of the Aeneid narrated by and centered on Aeneas' Latin wife Lavinia, a minor character in the epic poem. It carries the action forward to the crowning of Aeneas' younger son Silvius as king of Latium.

A seventeenth-century popular broadside ballad also appears to recount events from books 1–4 of the Aeneid, focusing mostly on the relationship between Aeneas and Dido. The ballad, "The Wandering Prince of Troy", presents many similar elements as Virgil's epic, but alters Dido's final sentiments toward Aeneas, as well as presenting an interesting end for Aeneas himself.

Parodies and travesties
A number of parodies and travesties of the Aeneid have been made.

 One of the earliest was written in Italian by Giovanni Batista Lalli in 1635, titled L'Eneide travestita del Signor Gio.
 A French parody by Paul Scarron became famous in France in the mid-17th century, and spread rapidly through Europe, accompanying the growing French influence. Its influence was especially strong in Russia.
Charles Cotton's work Scarronides included a travestied Aeneid.
 In 1791 the Russian poet N. P. Osipov published .
 In 1798, "Eneida"—Ukrainian mock-heroic burlesque poem, was written by Ivan Kotliarevsky. It is considered to be the first literary work published wholly in the modern Ukrainian language. His epic poem was adapted into an animated feature film of the same name, in 1991, by Ukranimafilm.

See also
 Brutus of Troy
 Franciade
 Greek mythology
 Gulliver's Travels
 Les Troyens
 List of literary cycles
 Odyssey
 Parallels between Virgil's Aeneid and Homer's Iliad and Odyssey
 Papyrus Oxyrhynchus 31
 Prosody (Latin)
 Roman mythology
 Sinbad the Sailor
 The Voyage of Bran

Footnotes

Further reading
 Buckham, Philip Wentworth; Spence, Joseph; Holdsworth, Edward; Warburton, William; Jortin, John,  Miscellanea Virgiliana: In Scriptis Maxime Eruditorum Virorum Varie Dispersa, in Unum Fasciculum Collecta, Cambridge: Printed for W. P. Grant; 1825.
 
 
 
 
  Paperback reprint: Vintage Books, 1990.
 Virgil: The Aeneid (Landmarks of World Literature (Revival)) by K. W. Gransden 
 Virgil's 'Aeneid': Cosmos and Imperium by Philip R. Hardie 
 
 
 Brooks Otis, Virgil: A Study in Civilized Poetry, Oxford, 1964
 Lee Fratantuono, Madness Unchained: A Reading of Virgil's Aeneid, Lexington Books, 2007.
 Joseph Reed, Virgil's Gaze, Princeton, 2007.
 Kenneth Quinn, Virgil's Aeneid: A Critical Description, London, 1968.
 Francis Cairns, Virgil's Augustan Epic, Cambridge, 1989.
 Gian Biagio Conte, The Poetry of Pathos: Studies in Vergilian Epic, Oxford, 2007.
 Karl Gransden, Virgil's Iliad, Cambridge, 1984.
 Richard Jenkyns, Virgil's Experience, Oxford, 1998.
 Michael Burden, A woman scorned; responses to the Dido myth, London, Faber and Faber, 1998, especially Andrew Pinnock, 'Book IV in plain brown paper wrappers', on the Dido travesties.
 Wolfgang Kofler, Aeneas und Vergil. Untersuchungen zur poetologischen Dimension der Aeneis, Heidelberg 2003.
 Eve Adler, Vergil's Empire, Rowman and Littlefield, 2003.
 Nurtantio, Yoneko (2014), Le silence dans l'''Énéide, Brussels: EME & InterCommunications, 
 Markus Janka, Vergils Aeneis: Dichter, Werk und Wirkung, Munich, 2021.

External links

Translations
 
  – Latin text, Dryden translation, and T.C. Williams translation (from the Perseus Project)
 Gutenberg Project: John Dryden translation (1697)
 Gutenberg Project: J. W. Mackail translation (1885)
 Gutenberg Project: E. F. Taylor translation (1907)
 Gutenberg Project: Rolfe Humphries translation (1951)
 Fairclough's Loeb Translation (1916) StoicTherapy.com (Complete)
 Fairclough's Loeb Translation (1916) Theoi.com (Books 1–6 only)
 The Online Library of Liberty Project from Liberty Fund, Inc.: The Aeneid (Dryden translation, New York: P.F. Collier and Son, 1909) (PDF and HTML)
 

Text
 Aeneidos Libri XII Latin text by Publius Vergilius Maro, PDF format
 Menu Page The Aeneid in several formats at Project Gutenberg
 Latin Text Online

Sequels
 The Thirteenth Book of the Aeneid: a fragment by Pier Candido Decembrio, translated by David Wilson-Okamura
 Supplement to the twelfth book of the Aeneid by Maffeo Vegio at Latin text and English translation

Illustrations
 Warburg Institute Iconographic Database (about 900 images related to the Aeneid)

Commentary
Commentary on selections from the Latin text at Dickinson College Commentaries
 Four talks by scholars on aspects of the Aeneid'': Virgil's relationship to Roman history, the Rome of Caesar Augustus, the challenges of translating Latin poetry, and Purcell's opera Dido and Aeneas, delivered at the Maine Humanities Council's Winter Weekend program.
 Notes on the political context of the Aeneid.
 Perseus/Tufts: Maurus Servius Honoratus. Commentary on the Aeneid of Vergil. (Latin)
 

 
1st-century BC Latin books
Julio-Claudian dynasty
Greece in fiction
Italy in fiction
Poems published posthumously
Poetry based on the Iliad
Poetry based on the Odyssey
Roman underworld
Trojan War literature
Underworld in classical literature
Unfinished poems
Depictions of Augustus in literature
Articles containing video clips